Ralph Coates (26 April 1946 – 17 December 2010) was an English footballer who played at both professional and international levels as a winger. Coates played for Burnley, Tottenham Hotspur and Orient, making 480 appearances in the Football League. Coates also earned four caps for England during 1970 and 1971.

Club career
Coates was born in Hetton-le-Hole, County Durham. He was an apprentice colliery fitter and his footballing ability was spotted by Burnley's North-East scout Jack Hixon. Coates joined Burnley on trial in 1961 and after a period as an apprentice turned professional in 1963. He made his first-team debut in December 1964 scoring his first goal in a 2–0 win against Leicester City in March 1965. He would go on to make 261 appearances for Burnley in all competitions scoring 32 goals. After Burnley had been relegated from the First Division in 1971 Coates was sold to Tottenham Hotspur for a fee of £190,000. He played over 300 games for Tottenham and earned winner's medals for the 1972 UEFA Cup and the 1973 Football League Cup Final where he scored the winning goal in the final. Coates left Tottenham in 1978 and had a short period playing with St George in the Australian National Soccer League before returning to play for Orient where he was also on the coaching staff. He played 84 games in all competitions for Orient scoring 12 goals.

He retired from professional football in 1982 but continued to play non-league football for Hertford Heath, Ware and Nazeing.

International career

Coates played eight times for England U-23 and four times for England. He was a member of the initial squad for the 1970 World Cup but was not selected for the final squad which travelled to Mexico.

Personal life
Coates was married twice, first to Veronica Banks in 1968 (whom he subsequently divorced) and then to Lesley Clarkson in 1981 (from whom he had separated by the time of his death). He had a son and a daughter. Coates was a Labour Party supporter.

After his football career ended Coates became a travel agent. He later moved into the leisure industry, managing leisure centres in Chelmsford and Boreham Wood and was involved with Tottenham Hotspur for over 20 years where he worked as a match-day host. He also was a football coach for disabled children.

Death
In early December 2010, he suffered a series of strokes and was hospitalised. He died on 17 December 2010 at the Luton and Dunstable Hospital NHS Trust aged 64.

References

External links
Ralph Coates R.I.P

1946 births
2010 deaths
English footballers
England international footballers
England under-23 international footballers
Burnley F.C. players
Tottenham Hotspur F.C. players
Leyton Orient F.C. players
Ware F.C. players
English Football League players
Expatriate soccer players in Australia
National Soccer League (Australia) players
People from Hetton-le-Hole
Footballers from Tyne and Wear
English Football League representative players
UEFA Cup winning players
Association football wingers